76th NBR Awards
January 11, 2005

Best Film: 
 Finding Neverland 
The 76th (US) National Board of Review Awards, honoring the best in film for 2004, were given on 11 January 2005.

Top 10 films
Finding Neverland
The Aviator
Closer
Million Dollar Baby
Sideways
Kinsey
Vera Drake
Ray
Collateral
Hotel Rwanda

Top Foreign Films
The Sea Inside (Mar adentro)
Bad Education (La mala educación)
Maria Full of Grace (María llena eres de gracia)
The Chorus (Les choristes) 
The Motorcycle Diaries (Los diarios de motocicleta)

Top Five Documentaries
Born into Brothels
Z Channel: A Magnificent Obsession
Paper Clips Project
Super Size Me
The Story of the Weeping Camel

Winners
Best Film: 
Finding Neverland
Best Foreign Language Film: 
Mar adentro (The Sea Inside), Spain/France/Italy
Best Actor: 
Jamie Foxx - Ray
Best Actress: 
Annette Bening - Being Julia
Best Supporting Actor: 
Thomas Haden Church - Sideways
Best Supporting Actress: 
Laura Linney - Kinsey
Best Acting by an Ensemble: 
Closer
Breakthrough Performance Actor: 
Topher Grace - In Good Company and P.S.
Breakthrough Performance Actress: 
Emmy Rossum - The Phantom of the Opera
Best Director:
Michael Mann - Collateral
Best Directorial Debut:
Zach Braff - Garden State
Best Screenplay - Adapted: 
Sideways - Alexander Payne and Jim Taylor
Best Screenplay - Original: 
Eternal Sunshine of the Spotless Mind - Charlie Kaufman
Best Documentary:
Born into Brothels
Best Animated Feature: 
The Incredibles
Career Achievement:
Jeff Bridges
Billy Wilder Award for Excellence in Directing:
Miloš Forman
Special Filmmaking Achievement:
Clint Eastwood, for producing, directing, acting, and scoring Million Dollar Baby
Outstanding Production Design:
House of Flying Daggers
Outstanding Film Music Composition:
Jan A. P. Kaczmarek - Finding Neverland 
Career Achievement - Cinematography:
Caleb Deschanel
William K. Everson Award for Film History:
Richard Schickel
Producers Award:
Jerry Bruckheimer
Freedom of Expression:
Fahrenheit 9/11
The Passion of the Christ
Conspiracy of Silence
Special Recognition For Excellence In Filmmaking:
The Assassination of Richard Nixon
Before Sunset
The Door in the Floor
Enduring Love
Eternal Sunshine of the Spotless Mind
Facing Windows
Garden State
A Home at the End of the World
Imaginary Heroes
Since Otar Left
Stage Beauty
Undertow
The Woodsman

External links
National Board of Review of Motion Pictures :: Awards for 2004

2004
2004 film awards
2004 in American cinema